Karan Faridoon Bilimoria, Baron Bilimoria,  (born 26 November 1961) is a British Indian businessman, life peer in the UK House of Lords, and a university chancellor.

Bilimoria founded the global beer brand, Cobra Beer and is the company's chairman. In addition to his business activity, Bilimoria is a politically active crossbench member of the House of Lords, serves as Chancellor of the University of Birmingham and President of the Confederation of British Industry.

Family background
Karan Bilimoria was born in Hyderabad, India into a Zoroastrian Parsi family which hailed from Gujarat. As the surname 'Bilimoria' denotes, the ancestral home of the family is the small town of Bilimora, situated on the banks of the river Ambika, in Gandevi taluka of Navsari district of Gujarat state.

Bilimoria's family had a strong background in trade and commerce, but his father and both his grandfathers served in the Indian armed forces. In 1931, his paternal grandfather, Nasservanji D. Bilimoria, was one of the first Indians to be commissioned as an officer into the Indian Army from the Royal Military College, Sandhurst, and he retired as a Brigadier.

Bilimoria's father, Faridoon Noshir Bilimoria (1933–2005), popularly known as 'General Billy', had a long and distinguished career in the Indian Army. As a young, newly commissioned officer, he served as ADC to the first President of India, Rajendra Prasad. Many years later, he commanded the 2/5 Gorkha Rifles (Frontier Force) during the Bangladesh Liberation War. He later served as General Officer Commanding-in-Chief of the Indian Army's Central Command. In 1990, while serving at that post, F. N. Bilimoria was deputed by the Government of India to Sri Lanka to review the work of the Indian Peace Keeping Force, which had been deployed in that country during the Sri Lankan Civil War under the Indo-Sri Lanka Accord. It was on his recommendation that the force was recalled in 1990, ending India's military engagement with the LTTE.

Karan Bilimoria's mother, Yasmin Bilimoria (née Italia), was the daughter of Jamshed D. Italia, a Squadron Leader in the Royal Indian Air Force. Her mother, Aimai Italia née Bharucha of Hyderabad, was the daughter of D.D. Italia, a Hyderabad-based businessman and politician who served as a member of the Rajya Sabha in the 1950s (this was Karan's maternal great-grandfather). Both his mother and maternal grandfather were educated in Britain at Birmingham University.

Early life
Bilimoria did his early schooling in Hyderabad from Hyderabad Public School at Begumpet, Hyderabad where the family lived at his mother's ancestral home, Anand Bhavan, while his father served in different military stations in the country. As he grew, his family began to accompany his father, and Bilimoria attended seven different schools before he was sent to board at Hebron School in the Nilgiris, Tamil Nadu, alongside his younger brother, Nadir. When he was still nineteen, Karan received his Bachelor of Commerce degree from Osmania University in Hyderabad in 1981.

On receiving a scholarship, he then moved to London where he qualified as a chartered accountant with what is today Ernst & Young and received a diploma in accounting from the London Metropolitan University. Thereafter he read law at Sidney Sussex College, Cambridge. While at Cambridge, Bilimoria played on the university's polo team, organising their first ever tour of India, receiving a Half-Blue in 1988, and led the debating team against Oxford for two years, becoming also the vice-president of the Cambridge Union before graduating in 1988.

During the India tour of the Cambridge University polo team, Bilimoria noticed that the polo sticks made in India were different and of better quality than those made in Britain. At the time, polo sticks made in Argentina were very popular but following the Falklands War, imports of Argentinian products into Britain had been banned and there was little competition to British manufacturers. Bilimoria began to import polo sticks from India to fill in the gap, selling these successfully and profitably to Harrod's and Lillywhites. He also experimented with importing fashion goods, fabrics, and other products from India, but unlike the polo sticks these were not very successful ventures.

In 1993 he married Lynne Heather Walker, a South African national.

Cobra Beer
In 1989, along with his friend Arjun Reddy, Bilimoria founded Cobra Beer in a flat in Fulham. The idea for the beer had come up while he was a student at Cambridge, where he regularly ate his meals at Indian restaurants. He noticed that regular lager was too gassy and bloating to be enjoyed with food, while ale was too bitter to accompany a meal. He came up with a concept for a beer that had 'the refreshing qualities of a lager' but the 'smoothness and drinkability of an ale' to accompany food – in particular, Indian food and curry. In 1989, after concluding his import-export ventures, Bilimoria and Arjun Reddy started Cobra Beer.

At the time Bilimoria had a student debt of £20,000, and funds to start the business were not easy to find. Borrowing money from various sources and £30,000 from a bank, Cobra commenced operations. A brewer in Bangalore, India, Subroto Cariapa, and the owner of Mysore Breweries, a Mr Balan, liked the idea of the beer and helped create Cobra. From India, then, it was imported to Britain. In a battered old Citroen 2CV, Bilimoria himself began distributing 15 cases of beer at a time across London and, slowly, outside it.

Since marketing on a large scale was not an option because of the paucity of funds, penetrating Britain's highly competitive beer market required an innovative approach. The task was made all the more challenging because by 1990 the country was also in an economic recession. Cobra took off in these circumstances by creating a niche for itself in the market. Indian curry was becoming increasingly popular in the country at the time and so Cobra Beer was marketed and sold as the perfect drink to go with it. Bilimoria delivered cases of Cobra to Indian restaurants, where it became very popular with customers. Within five years, the one million mark in sales revenues was crossed. Cobra began to be served across the United Kingdom in thousands of Indian restaurants and the business began to grow, expanding into the pub and bar sector and also being sold in major supermarket chains. In 1999, the company diversified into wine.

By 2001 Cobra, from which Bilimoria's partner had now exited, had a turnover of nearly £13 million with a sales growth rate of nearly 60% per year, and was being brewed locally in the UK by Charles Wells Ltd. By 2007 Cobra was being sold in over 45 countries, and had a total production capacity of 450,000 cases per month. Revenues stood at £30 million and, with rapid expansion, were expected to cross £100 million by 2010.

In May 2009 the company went into administration.  The company owed an estimated £70 million to creditors. Molson Coors, one of the world's largest brewers, then paid circa £14 million for a 50.1% share in a pre-pack administration deal, leaving Bilimoria and his shareholders with the other 49.9%, and signed a joint venture deal under the name the Cobra Beer Partnership, of which Bilimoria is chairman. In October 2009 Bilimoria stated that the creditors of Cobra Beer would be settled out of future profits of the joint venture.

Panama Papers controversy 
Bilimoria was implicated in the Panama Papers leak: he was listed as a shareholder in Mulberry Holdings Asset Limited, a company registered in the Virgin Islands. However, he released a statement claiming that the company was dormant and had been formed for his ex-shareholders in Cobra, who were not residents of the UK; furthermore he stated that he was taxed on all of his global income in the UK and had declared his interests to the authorities. As a result of these allegations the University of Birmingham Branch of the UCU called for an investigation into his finances in 2016; the university had released a statement the day before calling it a personal matter, referencing Bilimoria's previous statement to the media.

Honours and positions
Bilimoria was appointed as a Deputy Lieutenant for Greater London in 2001 and he was appointed a Commander of the Order of the British Empire (CBE) in the 2004 Birthday Honours for his services to business and entrepreneurship. He was appointed an Independent Crossbench Life Peer in the House of Lords and was created Baron Bilimoria, of Chelsea in the Royal Borough of Kensington and Chelsea on 16 June 2006. He is the first Zoroastrian Parsi to sit in the House of Lords.

Bilimoria has been a non-executive director and senior independent director of the Booker Group PLC, the UK's largest wholesale operator, since 2007. In 2011 he became chairman of Molson Coors Cobra India, a joint venture between Cobra Beer and Molson Coors in India. He was awarded an honorary doctorate from Heriot-Watt University in 2005. On 17 July 2014, Bilimoria was installed as the 7th Chancellor of the University of Birmingham. He served as the Bynum Tudor Fellow of Kellogg College, Oxford for the 2017–18 academic year.

In June 2020, Bilimoria was elected as the President of the Confederation of British Industry.

Arms

Publications
 2007: Bottled for Business: The Less Gassy Guide to Entrepreneurship (London: Capstone) with Steve Coomber, 
 2009: Against the Grain: Lessons in Entrepreneurship from the Founder of Cobra Beer (London: Capstone),

References

External links
 Biography and further details at Parliament.uk
 Record in Parliament at TheyWorkForYou.com
 Personal website at LordBilimoria.co.uk

Alumni of Sidney Sussex College, Cambridge
English brewers
Parsi people
British people of Parsi descent
Gujarati people
Businesspeople from Hyderabad, India
British politicians of Indian descent
Commanders of the Order of the British Empire
Deputy Lieutenants of Greater London
1961 births
Crossbench life peers
People's peers
People associated with the University of West London
Living people
Indian emigrants to England
Osmania University alumni
Chancellors of the University of Birmingham
British accountants
Hebron School alumni
British Zoroastrians
Naturalised citizens of the United Kingdom
Ernst & Young people
Recipients of Pravasi Bharatiya Samman
Life peers created by Elizabeth II
Indian peers